Leucoptera meyricki is a moth in the Lyonetiidae family that is found in Ivory Coast, Angola, Congo, East Africa, Ethiopia and Madagascar. It was also discovered in Kenya and Tanzania. It is considered one of the worst pest species on coffee.

The larvae feed on Coffea arabica and other Coffea species. They mine the leaves of their host plant.

References

External links

Further reading

Leucoptera (moth)
Moths of Sub-Saharan Africa
Moths of Réunion
Moths of Madagascar
Moths described in 1940